Marko Backovic (born February 19, 1997) is a British-Serbian professional basketball player, who is currently playing for Sheffield Sharks.

Backovic took up basketball in secondary school, whilst attending Stocksbridge High School. From starting with Sheffield Junior Sharks, Marko was very quickly selected by the England and also Great Britain national basketball team.

Whilst in secondary school Marko was representing the age bracket above his own age, for both England and Great Britain. Marko was also scouted by several American high schools and received a number of offers to study in the US.

Marko was part of the Sheffield Sharks roster who won the 2016 BBL Playoffs at the O2 Arena. Sharks claimed an 84-77 victory over the highly fancied Leicester Riders.

References

1997 births
Living people
British men's basketball players
Serbian men's basketball players
Sheffield Sharks players
Sportspeople from Sheffield
Small forwards